Power Rangers Megaforce is the twentieth season of the long-running television series Power Rangers. The show is produced by SCG Power Rangers and began airing on Nickelodeon on February 2, 2013. The show was part of the Power Rangers 20th anniversary. Kidscreen reported that Megaforce featured "the return of many historic Rangers." Megaforce uses footage, costumes and props from the Japanese Super Sentai Series Tensou Sentai Goseiger.

The second season, and twenty-first overall, is called Power Rangers Super Megaforce and premiered on February 15, 2014. Super Megaforce uses footage, costumes and props from Kaizoku Sentai Gokaiger. Their sentai counterpart shows are angel and pirate themed.

Promotion
The Megaforce Power Rangers appeared at the 2012 Macy's Thanksgiving Day Parade, along with the past Red Rangers from Mighty Morphin Power Rangers through Power Rangers Super Samurai. The Rangers' Super Megaforce forms later appeared alongside the Mighty Morphin' Rangers during the 2013 Macy's Thanksgiving Day Parade.

Plot

Season 1: Megaforce

When the evil Warstar aliens attack Earth, the supernatural guardian Gosei, assigned to protect the Earth by Zordon, and his faithful robot assistant Tensou recruit five teenagers with attitude to combat the invading forces. Equipped with powers that grant them mastery over martial arts and other forms of combat, the teenagers transform into the latest champions of good: The Power Rangers Megaforce.

Season 2: Super Megaforce
In the second Super Megaforce season, when an alien armada led by Prince Vekar - the brother of Vrak - plans to invade the Earth, Gosei gives the Megaforce Rangers new Morphers and special keys to allow them to become the Super Megaforce Rangers and also imbues them with the power to transform into any past "Legendary" Power Rangers. In course of time, due to their virtues and fighting spirit, they unlock various megazords of the past rangers (meeting several along the way.). An alien named Orion, whose home world was destroyed by the armada, then joins their ranks as the Silver Ranger, and gets all the legendary Sixth Ranger along with those of Robo Knight. Later, in a battle with the most powerful machines of evil, the Megazords of the Rangers as well as their Legendary Megazords are destroyed. After that, Troy and Orion enter the ship of Vrak and Vekar's father the Warstar Emperor Marvo, fight him, and unleash the ship's power, which destroys every other ship in the Armada. Later they both succeed in destroying Marvo and then they return to the ground. The Rangers then find that thousands of X-Borgs, the innumerable soldiers of The Armada, have been let loose on them. At this point, all the Legendary Rangers, whose powers the Rangers have been using throughout the series, appear to help them. Together, all the Rangers destroy the X-Borgs, saving the Earth.

Cast and characters

Power Rangers 
 Andrew Gray as Troy Burrows, the Megaforce/Super Megaforce Red
 Christina Masterson as Emma Goodall, the Megaforce/Super Megaforce Pink
 Azim Rizk as Jake Holling, the Megaforce Black/Super Megaforce Green
 Ciara Hanna as Gia Moran, the Megaforce/Super Megaforce Yellow
 John Mark Loudermilk as Noah Carver, the Megaforce/Super Megaforce Blue
 Chris Auer as the voice of Robo Knight
 Cameron Jebo as Orion, the Super Megaforce Silver

Supporting characters
 Geoff Dolan as the voices of Gosei, Gosei Morpher, and Robo Morpher
 Estevez Gillespie as the voice of Tensou
 Shailesh Prajapati as Ernie
 Ian Harcourt as Mr. Burley

Legendary Rangers
 Jason David Frank as Tommy Oliver, the Green Ranger and the White Ranger, and subsequently Zeo Ranger V, Red, the first Red Turbo Ranger and the Black Dino Thunder Ranger.
 Selwyn Ward as Theodore Jay "T.J." Jarvis Johnson, the Blue Space Ranger, and previously the second Red Turbo Ranger.
 Patricia Ja Lee as Cassie Chan, The Pink Space Ranger and previously the second Pink Turbo Ranger.
 Danny Slavin as Leo Corbett, the Red Galaxy Ranger.
 Reggie Rolle as Damon Henderson, The Green Galaxy Ranger.
 Melody Perkins as Karone, the second Pink Galaxy Ranger, and the former Astronema.
 Sean Cw Johnson as Carter Grayson, the Red Lightspeed Ranger.
 Alison MacInnis as Dana Mitchell, the Pink Lightspeed Ranger.
 Jason Faunt as Wesley "Wes" Collins, the Red Time Force Ranger.
 Jason Smith as Casey Rhodes, the Red Jungle Fury Ranger.
 Alex Heartman as Jayden Shiba, The Red Samurai Ranger.
 Hector David Jr. as Mike, The Green Samurai Ranger.
 Brittany Anne Pirtle as Emily, The Yellow Samurai Ranger.

Villains 
 Jason Hood as the voice of Vrak the younger brother of Vekar, the main and primary antagonist of the series.
 Phil Brown and Paul Harrop as the voices of Tresnag and Drill Horn
 Campbell Cooley as the voice of Admiral Malkor
 Mark Mitchinson as the voice of Creepox
 Charlie McDermott as the voice of Bigs
 Jay Simon as the voice of Bluefur
 Sophie Henderson as the voice of Metal Alice
 Andrew Laing as the voice of Messenger a minor villain from the Armada.
 Stephen Butterworth as the voice of Prince Vekar the older brother of Vrak.
 Rebecca Parr as the voice of Levira
 Mike Drew as the voice of Emperor Marvo the father of Vrak and Vekar.
 John Leigh as Damaras
 Mark Wright as Argus
 Cameron Rhodes as the voice of Professor Cog

Episodes 

 Power Rangers Megaforce (Season 20, 2013) 

 Power Rangers Super Megaforce (Season 21, 2014)

Notes

References

External links

 Official Power Rangers Website
  (Megaforce)
  (Super Megaforce)
  (Nickelodeon)
 

 
Megaforce
2013 American television series debuts
2014 American television series endings
2010s American high school television series
2010s American television series
2010s American science fiction television series
2010s Nickelodeon original programming
Television series about size change
Television shows filmed in New Zealand
Television shows set in California
American children's action television series
American children's adventure television series
American children's fantasy television series
Television series created by Haim Saban